Kåre Grøndahl Hagem (9 March 1915 – 2 August 2008) was a Norwegian politician for the Conservative Party.

He served as a deputy representative to the Parliament of Norway from Østfold during the term 1958–1961. In total he met during 8 days of parliamentary session.

References

1915 births
2008 deaths
Deputy members of the Storting
Conservative Party (Norway) politicians
Østfold politicians